4 the Cause were a 1990s Germany based band from Oak Park, Illinois, near Chicago. The band consists of the family members Shonna Edwards , Bennie Edwards , Reshonda Landfair and Jason Edwards.

Background
Founded in March 1993 under the name Young Warriors 4 the Cause, it took winning The Apollo Style talent contest at school in 1995 to land their first record contract. In 1997, while under the management of Bell Miles and Robert Williams (management team for the successful band The Moffatts), the band decided to shorten their name to 4 the Cause.

Breakthrough
The band gained success in 1998 with their cover of Ben E. King's hit song "Stand by Me", which was particularly successful in Europe, reaching the Top 10 in eight countries. Later that year, their debut album of the same name, Stand by Me was released. The group also had a minor hit with a cover of the Bill Withers song, "Ain't No Sunshine". They released two more singles before disbanding in 2000.

Discography

Albums

Singles

References

Musical groups established in 1993
Musical groups from Chicago
American contemporary R&B musical groups
American vocal groups
Family musical groups
RCA Records artists
Bertelsmann Music Group artists
1993 establishments in Illinois